The Lipscomb Bisons men's basketball team is the men's basketball team that represents Lipscomb University in Nashville, Tennessee, United States. The school's team currently competes in the ASUN Conference. The Bisons made their first ever trip to the NCAA tournament in school history in 2018, when they defeated Florida Gulf Coast University in the ASUN Conference tournament final. In 2019, Lipscomb made history by becoming the first team in ASUN history to make it to the NIT Finals.

History
Lipscomb has a 311–280 all-time record in NCAA basketball and a 186–141 record in ASUN games. Lipscomb won their first ASUN men's basketball tournament title in 2018, despite winning the regular-season conference title twice before, in 2006 and 2010. The Bisons made the NCAA tournament for the first time in 2018. They have competed in the NIT twice, in 2006 and 2019. Lipscomb is also home to the top two all-time leading college basketball scorers, John Pierce and Philip Hutcheson.  Lipscomb also won the NAIA National championship in 1986.

Battle of the Boulevard
Lipscomb maintains a rivalry with nearby Belmont University, and the two men's basketball teams compete annually in a game known as the Battle of the Boulevard. The game is named for Belmont Boulevard, which both schools are located on; the  separating the schools makes them among the closest rivals in NCAA Division I men's basketball. The rivalry began in 1953, when both schools played in the NAIA, and continued into the NCAA when both schools transitioned to Division I in the 1990s. Lipscomb leads the all-time series 73–61, while Belmont leads 14–9 in NCAA play.

One unique feature of the rivalry is that the teams play two games each season on a home-and-away basis, even though they have not been in the same conference since Belmont left the Atlantic Sun for the Ohio Valley Conference in 2012. The only other non-conference rivalry in Division I that is played twice each season is New Mexico–New Mexico State.

Postseason

NCAA tournament results
The Bisons have appeared in one NCAA tournament.

NIT results
The Bisons have appeared in two National Invitation Tournament (NIT). Their record is 4–2. They were the runner up in 2019.

NAIA tournament results
The Bison have appeared in the NAIA Tournament 14 times. Their combined record is 21–13. They were NAIA National Champions in 1986.

Notable alumni
Gary Colson, college basketball coach
Adnan Hodžić, professional basketball player
Garrison Mathews, NBA player
John Pierce, college basketball all-time/all-division scoring leader with 4,230 points
Marvin Williams, professional basketball player

References

External links